Jim Huchingson is a retired soccer forward who played professionally in the American Professional Soccer League.

In 1988, Huchingson played for the San Jose Earthquakes in the Western Soccer Alliance.  In 1990, he joined Real Santa Barbara of the American Professional Soccer League.  His nine goals put him eighth on the goal scoring list and ninth on the points list that season.  He moved to the Salt Lake Sting for the 1991 season.  In 1992, Huchingson played for the Palo Alto Firebirds of the USISL.  The Firebirds won the championship that season, with Huchingson scoring the only goal in the final.  He was USISL All League that season.
Since retiring from soccer, Jim has successfully started two extremely lucrative businesses and continues to dominate any field he enters.

References

Living people
American Professional Soccer League players
Palo Alto Firebirds players
Real Santa Barbara players
Salt Lake Sting players
San Jose Earthquakes (1974–1988) players
USISL players
Western Soccer Alliance players
Association football forwards
American soccer players
Year of birth missing (living people)